Big Muddy Records is an independent American roots music record label based out of St Louis, Missouri.  Founded by Chris (Kristo) Baricevic in 2005, Big Muddy Records has been a pivotal element in the development of many of St Louis' roots music acts, ranging from garage rock, punk, country, traditional jazz, blues, and folk music. Big Muddy Records is distributed by Entertainment One and Amped.

Big Muddy Records artists include The Hooten Hallers, Jack Grelle, Ryan Koenig, Maximum Effort, Sidney Street Shakers, Rum Drum Ramblers, The Strange Places, The Loot Rock Gang, The Hobosexuals, Tortuga, and Southwest Watson Sweethearts.

Past Big Muddy recording artists include Pokey LaFarge, Bob Reuter of The Dinosaurs and Alley Ghost, and 7 Shot Screamers.

Bob Reuter and his legacy
After the death of Bob Reuter in 2013, Chris Baricevic and Big Muddy Records became executors of Reuter's estate, including his catalog of music and his photography. They were tasked with preserving his legacy and forming the Cowboy Angel Foundation. Big Muddy Records is working to re-issue Reuter's back catalog.

Awards

Big Muddy Records was awarded the Best Local Record Label in 2008  and 2009   by The Riverfront Times.

Discography

References

American independent record labels
Record labels established in 2005